Leonard Vincent Phillips (14 April 1890 – 13 August 1968) was an Australian rules footballer who played with St Kilda and Essendon in the Victorian Football League (VFL).

Notes

External links 

Len Phillips' playing statistics from The VFA Project
Essendon past player profile

1890 births
Australian rules footballers from Victoria (Australia)
St Kilda Football Club players
Essendon Football Club players
West Perth Football Club players
Hawthorn Football Club (VFA) players
Footscray Football Club (VFA) players
1968 deaths
People from Yarra Ranges